Meteorograph may refer to:

Meteogram, a graphical presentation of weather variables with respect to time
Barograph, a pressure recording device
Thermo-hygrograph, a pressure and temperature recording device